Shahzad Khalil, (1944 – 23 December 1989) was a Pakistani television director and producer.

Early life 
Shahzad Khalil began his career as a director producing music videos in 1970, and then moved to making television drama serials. After a few projects he moved from Pakistan Television Corporation (PTV), Lahore Center to its Karachi Center.

Career 
Khalil was not only an intelligent TV director but he had a great personality. He gained fame in a very short period of time as a result of the dramas he directed for Pakistan television. He was first recognised as a director for his TV serial Teesra Kinara in 1980 in which several legendary actors including Sahira Kazmi, Usman Peerzada, Rahat Kazmi, Shafi Mohammad, and Jamil Fakhri starred. Shahzad Khalil met Badar Khalil when she played the title role in the drama Bi Jamalo which he directed. They later married and have two children.

Shahzad Khalil's classic drama Tanhaiyaan was aired in 1985. Veteran actors cast in this serial included: Shehnaz Sheikh, Marina Khan, Badar Khalil, Azra Sherwani, Asif Raza Mir, Behroze Sabzwari, Qazi Wajid, Jamshed Ansari, Yasmeen Ismail, Durdana Butt, Mohammad Yousaf, Sultana Zafar, Subhani Ba Younas, and Imtiaz Ali. Haseena Moin who wrote Tanhaiyaan said: "The experience of working with Shehzad was wonderful. He was a thorough gentleman and extremely good in his work."

Shahzad Khalil introduced several actors such as Shafi Muhammad Shah in Teesra Kinara and Samina Peerzada in Panah among others, who went on to  become superstars in the Pakistani television industry.

In 2014, when his wife Bader Khalil emigrated to Canada to live with her son she said in an interview with Dawn News that: "PTV is celebrating its 50th anniversary; I don't see any remembrance for Shahzad Khalil. Are people so easily forgotten? It is hard to believe!"

Shahzad Khalil is known as one of the best Pakistani directors and will be remembered for his work and his role in Pakistan's television history. Indus TV Network presented a special award to Khalil for his outstanding contributions to Pakistan television at the 1st Indus Drama Awards in 2005, presented by Agha Nasir and Ghazanfar Ali.

Personal life 
Shahzad Khalil's wife is a veteran Pakistani TV actress, Badar Khalil. They have two children, Ibrahim and Umar.

Illness and death
Shahzad Khalil died of cardiac arrest on 23 December 1989 at the age of 45. His funeral prayers were held at the Defence Housing Authority graveyard. He was buried in the Defence Graveyard Karachi.

Notable television works 
 Teesra Kinara (1980)
 Bi Jamalo
 Tanhaiyaan (1985)
 Urta Asman
 Rashid Minhas Shaheed
 Panah
 Ehsaas
 Saagar Ka Aansoo
 Platform
 Dastak

Honour 
The Government of Pakistan named a street after him in Karachi in 1986.

Awards and recognition

References

External links
 

1944 births
1989 deaths
Pakistani television directors
Pakistani television producers
Recipients of the Pride of Performance
Muhajir people
Nigar Award winners
People from Karachi